Aberaeron is a former Urban District, known as Aberayron UD 1894–1966, and Aberaeron UD 1966–74, in Cardiganshire: replaced by Ceredigion.

External links
 Archives Wales, further information on Aberaeron

Urban districts of Wales
Aberaeron